PayPal Honey, formerly known as Honey, is an American technology company and subsidiary of PayPal known for developing a browser extension that aggregates and automatically applies online coupons on eCommerce websites.

History
Entrepreneurs Ryan Hudson and George Ruan founded Honey in November 2012 in Los Angeles, California, after building a prototype of the browser extension in late October 2012. A bug tester leaked the tool to Reddit, where it went viral. By March 2014, the company had 900,000 organic users.

Honey raised a $26 million Series C round, led by Anthos Capital in March 2017. By January 2018, Honey raised a total of $40.8 million in venture backing. 

On January 6, 2020, it was acquired by PayPal for about $4 billion. Nearly immediately after PayPal acquired Honey, Amazon claimed to its users that the extension was a security risk that sold personal information. A Wired Magazine article, written shortly after the acquisition, questioned whether the claim was motivated by PayPal's newly acquired ability to compete against Amazon.

In June 2022, the company was renamed PayPal Honey.

Marketing
PayPal Honey has become known for its heavy use of YouTube advertising and channel sponsorships for its marketing. Similarly to NordVPN, Amazon's Audible and Raid Shadow Legends, it offers paid sponsorships to popular YouTube channels such as MrBeast to expose the service to its viewers. In 2020, PayPal Honey launched a web series called "Honey Originals", where Honey partners were interviewed, including segments "20 Questions with _" and "Add To Cart with _".

Revenue
PayPal Honey's revenue comes from a commission made on user transactions with partnering retailers. When a member makes a purchase from merchants partnering with the company, Honey shares part of their commission with the member in a cashback program. Users are notified of price drops and price history on selected items sold by participating online stores.

References

PayPal
American companies established in 2012
Internet properties established in 2012
Technology companies based in Greater Los Angeles
Companies based in Los Angeles
Internet Explorer add-ons
Nonfree Firefox WebExtensions
Google Chrome extensions
Reward websites
2020 mergers and acquisitions
YouTube sponsors